Moturiki is an island belonging to Fiji's Lomaiviti Archipelago. Covering an area of 10.4 square kilometers, it is situated at 17.45° South and 178.44° East.

In the proto-polynesian language, 'Motu' means 'island' and Riki' means 'small' hence the islands name is directly translated as  "Small Island".

The island is inhabited by about 2000 Fijians living in 10 villages: Daku, Naicabecabe, Nasauvuki, Nasesara, Navuti, Niubasaga, Savuna, Uluibau, Yanuca and Wawa.

Moturiki is of great archaeological interest. Important discoveries include the earliest Lapita sites of Fiji as well as the oldest human skeleton found in Fiji (dating about 3000 years).

The villages on Moturiki have faced on-going disease outbreaks, including Typhoid fever, primarily due to the lack of safe drinking water. At points, this has required the large-scale delivery of clean water by boat and then manually distributed by vehicles and carts.

References

External links 
 Fiji Museum article about Moturiki

Islands of Fiji
Lomaiviti Province